Asian Judo Championships is the Judo Asian Championship organized by the Judo Union of Asia.

The men's tournament began in 1966 and was held approximately every four years, until 1991, when it became an annual event (except in the years when the Asian Games have been held.) The women's tournament was first staged in 1981, and it has been held with the men's tournament every year, except in 1984/5.

List of tournaments

Judo Team Asian Championships

Mixed Team

Medal table

References

Asian Championships Results
Year by year results

External links 
Judo Union of Asia

 
Asian Championships
Judo Championships
Recurring sporting events established in 1966
1966 establishments in Japan